The Truth, Justice and Healing Council was established by the Australian Catholic Bishops Conference as a national co-ordinating body to oversee the church's engagement with the 2015-17 Royal Commission into Institutional Responses to Child Sexual Abuse and the pastoral and other ramifications that arose from the sexual abuse which it was called to investigate.

Personnel
The council was chaired by the Honourable Barry O'Keefe  until his 2014 death.

He was succeeded by the Honourable Neville Owen, a former judge, barrister and solicitor, and Francis J. Sullivan was appointed as CEO.

References